Julius Adolph Stöckhardt (4 January 1809 – 1 June 1886) was a German agricultural chemist. He is mostly recognized for his work on fertilizers, fume damage of plants and his book Die Schule der Chemie (School of Chemistry), which was translated into 14 languages. His 500 lectures and over 500 publications helped to establish agricultural chemistry in Germany.

Life
Stöckhardt was born in Röhrsdorf near Meißen on 4 January 1809 as son of a preacher. He was apprentice in a pharmacy from 1824 to 1828, studied at the University of Berlin, and obtained his Ph.D. from the University of Leipzig in 1837.

He worked at a mineral water factory from 1835 till he received a position at the Königlichen Gewerbeschule in Chemnitz (Royal Saxon Industrial School) in 1838. In 1846 he became a member of Dresden's scientific society ISIS, led by Ludwig Reichenbach.

From 1847 to 1883, Stöckhardt worked at the Königliche Forstakademie (Royal Saxon Academy of Forestry) in Tharandt, where a building was named after him. In 1866, he was elected Fellow of the Leopoldina.

He died in Tharandt on 1 June 1886 three years after he retired from the Forstakademie. One of his sons, Carl Georg Stöckhardt, emigrated to the United States and taught exegesis at the Concordia Seminary of the Lutheran Church St. Louis.

Work
After the book of Justus von Liebig, Organic Chemistry in its Application to Agriculture and Physiology was published in 1840, Stöckhardt recognized the importance of fertilization for farmers and invested most of his time in popularizing scientific knowledge. In 1843 he started to give chemical lectures for farmers. In 1850 he and Hugo Schober started to publish the Zeitschrift für deutsche Landwirthe (Journal for German farmers). One year later, Germany's first large agricultural experiment station opened in Leipzig-Möckern, initiated by Stöckhardt.

His research on fertilizers was influenced by the work of Liebig, but Stöckhardt included nitrogen compounds into his fertilizers. Liebig denied the need to include nitrogen because it was available as gas from air. This conflict escalated into an academic fight between him and the nitrogen advocates which also ended the friendship between Stöckhardt and Liebig. Eventually, nitrogen containing fertilizers became a great success.

His research in fume damage on plants especially by industrial exhaust was ground breaking. He fumigated plants with known amount of several chemical compounds, for example sulfur dioxide, to detect the minimal concentration at which damages occurs. A Commission for the detection of the damage caused by smelters was introduced and the state parliament of Saxony also dealt with damage caused by smelters after his results were published.

References

Publications

1809 births
1886 deaths
19th-century German chemists
Leipzig University alumni
Members of the Second Chamber of the Diet of the Kingdom of Saxony
Academic staff of the Royal Saxon Academy of Forestry
People from Meissen (district)